Hermes Diego Martínez (born 5 July 1992) is an Argentine professional football player who plays as a defender for Club Atlético Nueva Chicago.

Club career

River Plate
Martínez made his debut appearance on 16 May 2012, turning out in the quarter-finals of the Copa Argentina against San Lorenzo in a match which ended in a 2–0 victory. He then made his league debut on 23 September 2012 in a game against Racing.

Martínez also participated in the 2012 U-20 Copa Libertadores, winning it in his first and only attempt and beating Defensor Sporting in the final.

Loan to Sarmiento 
After manager Ramon Diaz made it clear that Martínez was not in his first team plans for the Torneo Inicial stage of the league campaign, he was loaned out to Sarmiento of the Primera B Nacional with whom he played 18 games.

Loan to Patronato 
The following season, Martínez was loaned out to Patronato de Parana, also of the B Nacional.

New York City FC 
On 22 January 2016, Martínez was unveiled as a signing for Major League Soccer side New York City FC, joining on a free transfer. Following a season where he struggled to crack the starting eleven, he was released from his contract with New York City on 28 November 2016.

Statistics

Club

Honours 
 River Plate
 U-20 Copa Libertadores: 2012

References

External links 
 
 

1992 births
Living people
Footballers from Buenos Aires
Argentine footballers
Club Atlético River Plate footballers
Club Atlético Sarmiento footballers
Club Atlético Patronato footballers
Club Sportivo Estudiantes players
San Martín de Tucumán footballers
Nueva Chicago footballers
New York City FC players
Association football defenders
Major League Soccer players
Argentine Primera División players
Primera Nacional players
Expatriate soccer players in the United States
Argentine expatriate sportspeople in the United States